Jordan James Gavaris (born September 25, 1989) is a Canadian actor. He is best known for his role as Felix Dawkins in the BBC America and Space television series Orphan Black (2013–2017). He is the lead in The Lake opposite Julia Stiles.

Early life
Gavaris was born and raised in Caledon, Ontario, Canada. His father is a Greek immigrant who worked for the Toronto District School Board before leaving to develop real estate in Toronto. His mother was born in Canada, and is of Northern European descent. She formerly had a career with The Globe and Mail. He is the youngest of three children.

Career 
Gavaris made his feature film debut in the Canadian independent film, 45 R.P.M. opposite Michael Madsen, Kim Coates, and Amanda Plummer. In 2010, Gavaris co-starred in the Cartoon Network live-action series Unnatural History. Gavaris also co-starred in the original drama Orphan Black for BBC America and Canada's Space.

In 2010, Gavaris was honoured by Playback, Panavision Canada, and The Canadian Film and Television Hall of Fame by being named one of 2010's "Top Ten to Watch".

In 2014, Gavaris won a Canadian Screen Award for Best Supporting Actor and also won a Constellation Award for best performance in an episode. On August 18, 2014, Gavaris was announced as the winner of the 2014 EWwy Award for Best Supporting Actor in a Drama Series.

In 2016, Gavaris appeared in a supporting role in the film Sea of Trees, directed by Gus Van Sant and starring Matthew McConaughey and Ken Watanabe, and 2017 saw him co-star with Lena Olin in the arthouse film Maya Dardel. The film premiered at the SXSW Film Festival to generally favorable reviews.

In the media
The English accent Gavaris employs for his role as Felix Dawkins has been noted for its authenticity, despite Gavaris not being English. Entertainment Weekly writer Dalton Ross has stated that he is "not entirely convinced that it’s not his normal accent that he’s faking." Gavaris told Ross that Michiel Huisman, Jerome Flynn and Maria Doyle Kennedy all thought he was English:When I lost the affectation after the read-through, Maria [Kennedy] was shocked. I think using an accent or affectation has given me a freedom as Felix I may not have otherwise found. The role has been by far the most liberating experience that anyone my age could have. There are so few colorful characters for people my age, it's a real treat to get to experiment in character work.

Personal life 
Gavaris had been dating actor and screenwriter Devon Graye since September 2013, and the two married in 2018.

He is a distant relative of Greek-French director Costa-Gavras.

Filmography

References

External links

 
 
 

1989 births
Living people
21st-century Canadian male actors
Canadian male film actors
Canadian male television actors
People from Brampton
Male actors from Ontario
Canadian people of Greek descent
Canadian gay actors
Best Supporting Actor in a Drama Series Canadian Screen Award winners
21st-century Canadian LGBT people